Oichalia , before 1981: Νεοχώρι - Neochori) is a town and a former municipality in the Trikala regional unit, Thessaly, Greece. Since the 2011 local government reform it is part of the municipality Farkadona, of which it is a municipal unit. The municipal unit has an area of 85.628 km2. In 2011 the population of the municipality was 4,781, the population of the town proper was 2,357. Oichalia is located 8 km west of Farkadona centre, and 20 km east of the city of Trikala. It is situated on the edge of the Thessalian Plain. The Greek National Road 6 (Larissa - Trikala - Ioannina - Igoumenitsa) passes south of Oichalia.

Subdivisions
The municipal unit Oichalia is subdivided into the following communities:
Georganades
Klokotos
Krini
Oichalia
Petroto

Population

See also
List of settlements in the Trikala regional unit

External links
Ichalia (municipality) on GTP Travel Pages
Ichalia (small town) on GTP Travel Pages

References

Populated places in Trikala (regional unit)